The World Transplant Games Federation (abbreviated as WTGF) is a United Kingdom-based non-profit organisation that aims to promote amateur sport amongst organ transplant recipients, living donors and donor families. The WTGF promotes the study of transplantation and aims to educate the public and raise awareness of the world shortage of donor organs. It shares new knowledge from biological/clinical studies and promotes the mental and moral improvement for recipients, living donors and donor families; and fosters international friendship and relations.

Established in 1978, the WTGF was formally incorporated in 2017 and is responsible for the organisation of World Transplant Games events, including the Summer Transplant Games and the Winter Transplant Games, both held every two years, on alternate years.

The WTGF is affiliated with the International Olympic Committee and its headquarters are located in Winchester.

Presidents 
The leading executive officer of the WTGF is called the president; and since formation the following have served in this role:

Calendar

wtgf.org/worldwide-events/

European Heart and Lung Transplant Championships 2022 / 6 - 11 June 2022 / Belgium

European Transplant and Dialysis Sports Games 2022 / 21 - 28 August 2022 / Oxford, UK

Transplant Games of America / 29 July - 3 August 2022 / USA (San Diego)

See also
 World Transplant Games
 European Transplant and Diabets Games
 Asian Transplant Games
 MENA Transplant Games

References

External links 

Federation 
Transplant organizations
Sport in Winchester
1978 establishments in the United Kingdom
Sports organizations established in 1978